The 1900 Navy Midshipmen football team represented the United States Naval Academy during the 1900 college football season. Under first-year head coach Garrett Cochran, the team compiled a 6–3 record, outscored its opponents 106 to 51, and shut out five of its nine opponents.

Schedule

References

Navy
Navy Midshipmen football seasons
Navy Midshipmen football